

91001–91100 

|-id=006
| 91006 Fleming ||  || Alexander Fleming (1881–1955) was a Scottish biologist and pharmacologist. His best-known achievements are the discovery of the enzyme lysozyme and isolation of the antibiotic substance penicillin, for which he shared a Nobel Prize in 1945 with Florey and Chain. || 
|-id=007
| 91007 Ianfleming ||  || Ian Fleming (1908–1964) was a British writer and journalist. Fleming is best remembered for creating the character of British Secret Service agent James Bond ("007") and chronicling his adventures in twelve novels and nine short stories. || 
|-id=023
| 91023 Lutan ||  || Lu Tan (born 1932), a Chinese astrophysicist and academician of the Chinese Academy of Sciences, has made contributions in the fields of compact-star physics, cosmology and high-energy astrophysics, especially gamma-ray bursts and afterglow physics. || 
|-id=024
| 91024 Széchenyi ||  || Count István Széchenyi (1791–1860), known as "The Greatest Hungarian", was a writer, reformer and patriot. In addition to promoting the first permanent bridge between Buda and Pest, he became famous for donating a year's income toward the foundation of the Hungarian Academy of Sciences. || 
|}

91101–91200 

|-id=199
| 91199 Johngray ||  || John Gray (born 1948), is a British philosopher who considers morality to be an illusion and mankind a rapacious species engaged in wiping out other forms of life while destroying its natural environment. || 
|}

91201–91300 

|-id=213
| 91213 Botchan ||  || Botchan is one of the most popular novels in Japan, written by Soseki Natsume in 1906. The story is based on the author's personal experience as a Tokyo-born young teacher being transferred to the city of Matsuyama, which is the stage of the novel || 
|-id=214
| 91214 Diclemente ||  || Aldo Di Clemente (born 1948), an Italian amateur astronomer, has worked as a technician at the Campo Imperatore station of the Astronomical Observatory of Rome since 1982. His assistance has been valuable in conducting the Campo Imperatore Near- Earth Object Survey. amateur astronomer, technician at the Campo Imperatore station of the Rome Observatory. || 
|-id=275
| 91275 Billsmith ||  || William S. Smith Jr. (born 1947) was for 15 years president of the Association of Universities for Research in Astronomy (AURA), which operates NSO, NOAO, STScI, Gemini and LSST. Bill was a strong advocate for diversity in the astronomical community. || 
|-id=287
| 91287 Simon-Garfunkel ||  || Simon & Garfunkel, American popular music duo of the 1960s. Paul Simon and Art Garfunkel were both born in 1941 and bred in Queens, New York. They became one of the most successful duos in the history of popular music. Their magic is heard through the beautiful high tenor voice of Garfunkel, as it gently wraps around Simon's natural talent of combining poetic lyrics with memorable melodies. || 
|}

91301–91400 

|-id=395
| 91395 Sakanouenokumo ||  || Saka no Ue no Kumo (Clouds Above the Hill) is a Japanese novel, written by Ryōtarō Shiba between 1968 and 1972. Based on the true story of three young men who lived in Matsuyama in the Meiji Period, this novel expresses the aspiration to western culture in Japan, which was en route to modernization. || 
|}

91401–91500 

|-id=422
| 91422 Giraudon || 1999 OH || Edmond Giraudon (born 1924), a French professor in mechanical engineering and a popularizer of astronomy, initiated the construction of five observatories in several high schools in the Provence Alpes, Côte d´Azur and Languedoc Roussillon regions of France. || 
|-id=428
| 91428 Cortesi ||  || Sergio Cortesi (born 1932), a Swiss astronomer who has been the director of the Istituto Ricerche Solari Locarno (Specola Solare Locarno-Monti, see IRSOL) since 1957. He was one of the co-founders and for a long time the president of the Ticino Astronomical Society (Src and Src). || 
|-id=429
| 91429 Michelebianda ||  || Michele Bianda (born 1956) a Swiss physicist who studied at ETH Zurich and is now the scientific director of the Istituto Ricerche Solari in Locarno, IRSOL. || 
|}

91501–91600 

|-id=553
| 91553 Claudedoom ||  || Claude Doom (born 1958) edited the Belgian astronomical magazine Heelal during 1994–1998 and is still a board member of the Flemish Amateur Astronomers Association. He wrote his Ph.D. thesis on the evolution of massive stars. The name was suggested by S. De Jonge, C. Steyaert and J. Meeus || 
|}

91601–91700 

|-id=604
| 91604 Clausmadsen ||  || Claus Madsen (born 1951), a Dutch photographic scientist and senior counsellor for international relations at the European Southern Observatory, who has played a crucial role in increasing public awareness and interest in astronomy. He helped create the European Association for Astronomy Education and was key in having the U.N. pass the IYA resolution (Src). || 
|-id=607
| 91607 Delaboudiniere ||  || Jean-Pierre Delaboudinière (born 1940), a French astronomer, is a pioneer of the exploration of the solar UV resonance spectroscopy of Helium, and the Principal Investigator of the solar EUV imaging spectroscopy experiments on the CNES D2B and the ESA/NASA Solar and Heliospheric Observatory missions. || 
|}

91701–91800 

|-bgcolor=#f2f2f2
| colspan=4 align=center | 
|}

91801–91900 

|-id=888
| 91888 Tomskilling ||  || Tom Skilling (born 1952) is an American meteorologist on WGN-TV in Chicago who is revered for the accuracy of his forecasts. He conducts annual free seminars at Fermilab on meteorology that are attended by several thousand people. He also includes much astronomical information in his weather reports. || 
|-id=890
| 91890 Kiriko Matsuri ||  || Kiriko Matsuri, is the name of a number of festivals that take place on the Japanese Noto Peninsula. A kiriko is an object like a big lantern; the biggest one is 15 meters high and weighs 2 tons. Many people carry kirikos on their shoulders and run with them. || 
|-id=898
| 91898 Margnetti ||  || Giuseppe Margnetti (born 1960) is a Swiss winemaker and artist living with his wife Danila (née Cosner) in the town of Camorino. || 
|}

91901–92000 

|-id=907
| 91907 Shiho ||  || Shiho Ochi (born 1984), born in Ehime prefecture, is the vocalist of the band Superfly. Since their major debut in 2007 with "Hello Hello", her rich voice and the band's soulful rock-and-roll music have fascinated many fans in Japan, including the discoverer || 
|}

References 

091001-092000